Alabama's 4th congressional district is a U.S. congressional district in Alabama, which elects a representative to the United States House of Representatives. It encompasses the counties of Franklin, Colbert, Marion, Lamar, Fayette, Walker, Winston, Cullman, Lawrence, Marshall, Etowah, and DeKalb. It also includes parts of Jackson and Tuscaloosa counties, as well as parts of the Decatur Metropolitan Area and the Huntsville-Decatur Combined Statistical Area.

It is currently represented by Republican Robert Aderholt. In the 2016 United States presidential election, the district was the only one in the country to give Donald Trump more than 80% of the vote, making it his strongest district in the country. Trump even improved on his 2016 performance in 2020, winning 81% of the vote. With a Cook Partisan Voting Index rating of R+33, it is the most Republican district in the United States.

Voting

List of members representing the district

Recent election results
These are the results from the previous ten election cycles in Alabama's 4th district.

2002

2004

2006

2008

2010

2012

2014

2016

2018

2020

2022

Historical district boundaries

See also

Alabama's congressional districts
List of United States congressional districts

References
Specific

General
 
 
 Congressional Biographical Directory of the United States 1774–present

External links
CNN coverage of the 2006 election
CNN coverage of the 2004 election
CNN coverage of the 2002 election
CNN coverage of the 2000 election

04
Colbert County, Alabama
Blount County, Alabama
Cullman County, Alabama
DeKalb County, Alabama
Etowah County, Alabama
Fayette County, Alabama
Franklin County, Alabama
Lamar County, Alabama
Marion County, Alabama
Marshall County, Alabama
Morgan County, Alabama
Pickens County, Alabama
Walker County, Alabama
Winston County, Alabama
Decatur metropolitan area, Alabama
Huntsville-Decatur, AL Combined Statistical Area
Constituencies established in 1833
1833 establishments in Alabama
Constituencies disestablished in 1841
1841 disestablishments in Alabama
Constituencies established in 1843
1843 establishments in Alabama
Constituencies disestablished in 1861
1861 disestablishments in Alabama
Constituencies established in 1868
1868 establishments in Alabama
Constituencies disestablished in 1963
1963 disestablishments in Alabama
Constituencies established in 1965
1965 establishments in Alabama